Darewali is a village in Batala in Gurdaspur district of Punjab State, India. The village is administrated by a sarpanch, an elected representative of the village.

Demography 
In 2011, Darewali had 248 houses and a population of 1,351 of which (730 males, 648 females) according to the report published by Census India in 2011. The literacy rate was 71.17%, lower than the state average of 75.84%. The population of children under the age of 6 years was 158, 11.70% of the population, with a child sex ratio of approximately 756, lower than the state average of 846.

See also
List of villages in India

References 

Villages in Gurdaspur district